Gaayam is a 1993 Indian Telugu-language crime political thriller film, based on the 1980s Vijayawada Gang Warfare.  Directed by Ram Gopal Varma, and story co-written by himself and Mani Ratnam, it stars Jagapathi Babu, Revathi, Urmila Matondkar  and music composed by Sri. Upon its release, the film won six state Nandi Awards in 1993.

The film is inspired by The Godfather (1972) which is based on Mario Puzo's novel The Godfather (1969).

Plot
The film begins with crime lord Durga who seeks justice for the needy affected due to the failure of the law & order system. Once, a victim approaches Durga whose daughter has been molested by a few manipulators. Durga wallops them and he is apprehended by a newly appointed cop Bharadwaj but he lets out in minutes. On the way, Durga notices his old flame Anitha and moves rearward. During their college days, the two are turtle doves. Anitha is a journalism student and an idealist while Durga is the brother of hoodlum Mohana Krishna. She accepts to nuptial him provided he should never take his brother’s path which he words to do so. Meanwhile, Mohana Krishna is assassinated by his arch-rival Gurunarayana a wicked corporator for pollical gain. 

Here enranged Durga adroitly slays the assailants of the crime and holds control over the city. However, Sarkar skips as he has been prisoned to cover up the situation. Knowing it, Anitha breaks up with him because she is against his rationalist way. As of today, Anitha is a sincere journalist who always fights to expose inequities, irregularities, and evils in society. Plus, she is knitted with Bharadwaj. Gurunarayana is grown up as an MLA of the ruling party. Besides, Durga's cousin Chitra has one side of her feelings and always supports him. Now Durga also focuses on his political career and to bar him Gurunarayana acquits Sarkar from jail. Then the power game begins between the gangs. Forthwith, Sarkar attacks Durga in the film theater in which many die. It makes a severe impact on Anitha, who decides to open up the truth. She meets Durga and tries to mend his way but he keeps a deaf ear. Later, she confesses her past relationship with Durga to Bharadwaj.
 
Currently, Durga learns the whereabouts of Sarkar and onslaughts on him when he escapes. Durga is behind Sarkar but he backs while observing Bharadwaj. Simultaneously, Anitha comes to take Gurunarayana’s interview regarding the chaos at the film theater. At that point, Sarkar reaches Gurunarayana’s residence in front of Anitha and Bharadwaj chases him. Gurunarayana tries to cover up the scene when donnybrook arises between Bharadwaj & Gurunarayana. Anitha struggles to publish the fact but she is always hindered by her editor. Afterward, Gurunarayana ploys and abducts Chitra when Durga rushes for her rescue. Therein, he is incriminated in a crime and seized. Bharadwaj is about to produce a witness against him who has been slaughtered by Gurunarayana. As a result, infuriated Bharadwaj charges Durga and imprisons him. 

The next, Gurunarayana intrigues to become Chief Minister by collapsing the government for which he conducts high religious riots that leaves severe destruction. Parallelly, in these revolts, Bharadwaj encounters henchmen of Gurunarayana. On that note, Gurunarayana reviles the department when Bharadwaj slaps him and he seeks vengeance. After facing several consequences Anitha covers up the incident and submits it to her editor. But he turns out and surrenders all the pieces of evidence to Gurunarayana. 

At Present, Gurunarayana ruses for a self-bomb blast to sympathy on eve of Ganesh Nimerjan. Alongside, Police department intel regarding Gurunarayana’s conspiracy, so, to impede they free Durga and enlist his aid. Bharadwaj has allocated the task of controlling the furor at the event when Gurunarayana announces to Anitha that he intends to kill her husband. Thus, she moves for Durga’s help and lands at the ritual with Chitra. Sarkar plans the bombing from an enclosed movie theater. Durga & Bharadwaj senses it and they successfully block him. Gurunarayana also enters the hideout to execute the plan when the bomb explodes at a safe distance without harming people. At last, Durga & Bharadwaj are in a safe space, Sarkar dies, and Gurunarayana is severely injured and sentenced later. Finally, the movie ends with Anitha thanking Durga, and he decides to take a new path.

Cast

 Jagapathi Babu as Durga
 Revathi as Anitha
 Urmila Matondkar as Chitra
 Kota Srinivasa Rao as Guru Narayan
 Charan Raj as Mohana Krishna
 Tanikella Bharani as Lawyer Saab
 Annapoorna as Chitra's mother
 M. Balaiah as Charigaaru
 Rami Reddy as Sarkar
 Uttej as Yadgiri
 Banerjee as Banerjee
 Narsing Yadav as Narsing
 Sirivennela Seetharama Sastry as Journalist Swamy
 Gummadi 
 Sivakrishna as Bharadwaja
 Tarzan as Srisailam
 Narayana Rao
 Ragini

Soundtrack

Music composed by Sri. Lyrics were penned by Sirivennela Sitarama Sastry.  Music released on Surya Audio Company. Sound designed by Nivas

Awards
Nandi Awards
 Best Supporting Actress - Urmila Matondkar
 Best Villain - Kota Srinivasa Rao
 Best Lyricist - Sirivennela Sitaramasastri
 Best Cinematographer - Rasool Ellore
 Best Editor - Shankar
 Best Audiographer - Srinivas

Sequel
After the film's success, Ram Gopal Varma and Jagapathi Babu planned to release a sequel titled Gaayam 2. Ram Gopal Varma was the producer in the sequel while Praveen Sri was the director. Vimala Raman was the heroine as Kota Srinivasa Rao again plays as the antagonist.

References

External links

1993 films
1990s Telugu-language films

Indian crime drama films
Indian crime thriller films
Indian political thriller films
Indian neo-noir films
1993 crime thriller films
1993 crime drama films
1990s crime thriller films
1990s political thriller films
Works based on The Godfather
Films about criminals
Journalism adapted into films
Films directed by Ram Gopal Varma
Films about organised crime in India
Crime films based on actual events